Tom Rhys Harries (born 8 October 1992) is a Welsh actor, best known for his roles as Manchester DJ Axel Collins in the Netflix series White Lines (2020) and Eddie Walker in the Apple TV+ series Suspicion (2022). Harries has also acted in recurring roles in the television series Jekyll and Hyde (2015), Unforgotten (2018), and Britannia (2019). In film, Harries has appeared in Hunky Dory (2011), Slaughterhouse Rulez  (2018), and The Gentlemen (2019).

Early life 
Tom Rhys Harries was born in Cardiff, Wales, to his mother a scriptwriter and his father a head teacher, and has two sisters. Rhys Harries took a course at the Royal Welsh College of Music & Drama in Cardiff, for which in 2020, he was made an Honorary Associate.

Career
For his work in the theatre, Rhys Harries was named as one of Screen International Stars of Tomorrow in 2012 In the theatre, Rhys Harries made his West End stage debut in 2013 in Jez Butterworth's Mojo alongside Colin Morgan, Rupert Grint, and Ben Whishaw at the Harold Pinter Theatre

Rhys Harries starred in the Guy Ritchie, action comedy The Gentlemen, where he starred alongside Colin Farrell, Hugh Grant, and Matthew McConaughey.
In 2020, Rhys Harries starred as Manchester DJ Axel Collins  in the Netflix series White Lines set on the island of Ibiza in the 1990s. The series' whodunnit storyline revolved around his character Axel's death, and was watched by over 20 million viewers.

in 2022, Ryhs Harries appears as Walker in Chris Long directed Apple TV+ series Suspicion, alongside co-stars Uma Thurman and Kunal Nayyar.

Filmography

Film

Television

Awards and nominations

References

External links 

Tom Rhys Harries- instagram

Living people
1992 births
21st-century English male actors
Alumni of the Royal Welsh College of Music & Drama
Welsh male television actors
Welsh male film actors
Welsh male stage actors
Male actors from Cardiff
People from Cardiff